Valéria de Oliveira (born 2 July 1974) is a Brazilian former handball player. She competed in the women's tournament at the 2000 Summer Olympics.

References

External links
 

1974 births
Living people
Brazilian female handball players
Olympic handball players of Brazil
Handball players at the 2000 Summer Olympics
People from Duque de Caxias, Rio de Janeiro
Sportspeople from Rio de Janeiro (state)
Handball players at the 1999 Pan American Games
Pan American Games gold medalists for Brazil
Pan American Games medalists in handball
Medalists at the 1999 Pan American Games
21st-century Brazilian women